EastMed is an abbreviation for "Eastern Mediterranean", used as a short name for:

East Mediterranean pipeline
East Mediterranean Gas Forum (EMGF)